The Coinage Offences Act 1861 (24 & 25 Vict. c. 99) was an Act of the Parliament of the United Kingdom which codified various coinage offences. It was repealed and replaced by the Coinage Offences Act 1936.

The statute provides that whoever falsely makes or counterfeits any coin resembling or apparently intended to resemble or pass for any current gold or silver coin of the realm (s. 2), or gilds, silvers, washes, cases over or colours with materials capable of producing the appearance of gold or silver a coin or a piece of any metal or mixture of metals, or files or alters it, with intent to make it resemble or pass for any current gold or silver coin (s. 3), or who buys, sells, receives or pays a false gold or silver coin at a lower rate than its denomination imports, or who receives into the United Kingdom any false coin knowing it to be counterfeit (ss. 6, 7), or who, without lawful authority or excuse, knowingly makes or mends, buys or sells, or has in his custody or possession, or conveys out of the Royal Mint any coining moulds, machines or tools, is guilty of felony (ss. 24, 25). The punishment for such offences is either penal servitude for life or for not less than three years, or imprisonment for not more than two years, with or without hard labour. Whoever impairs, diminishes or lightens current gold or silver coin, with intent to pass same, is liable to penal servitude for from three to fourteen years (s. 4), and whoever has in his possession filings or clippings obtained by impairing or lightening current coin is liable to the same punishment, or to penal servitude for from three to seven years.

The statute also makes provision against tendering or uttering false gold or silver coin, which is a misdemeanour, punishable by imprisonment with or without hard labour. Provision is also made with respect to falsely making, counterfeiting, tendering or uttering copper coin, exporting false coin, or defacing current coin by stamping names or words on it, and counterfeiting, tendering or uttering coin resembling or meant to pass as that of some foreign state.

The act applies to offences with respect to colonial coins as well as to those of the United Kingdom.

References

External links
 

United Kingdom Acts of Parliament 1861